The 2017–18 Ohio State Buckeyes men's basketball team represented Ohio State University in the 2017–18 NCAA Division I men's basketball season. Their head coach was Chris Holtmann, in his first season with the Buckeyes. The Buckeyes played their home games at Value City Arena in Columbus, Ohio as members of the Big Ten Conference. They finished the season 25–9, 15–3 in Big Ten play to finish in a tie for second place. As the No. 2 seed in the Big Ten tournament, they lost to Penn State in the quarterfinals. They received an at-large bid to the NCAA tournament as the No. 5 seed in the West region. They defeated South Dakota State in the First Round before losing to Gonzaga in the Second Round.

Previous season
The Buckeyes finished the 2016–17 season 17–15, 7–11 in Big Ten play to finish in a tie for 10th place. As the No. 11 seed in the Big Ten tournament, they lost in the first round to Rutgers.

On June 5, 2017, the school announced that head coach Thad Matta would not return as head coach. On June 9, the school hired Butler head coach Chris Holtmann as head coach.

Offseason

Departures

Incoming transfers

2017 recruiting class

2018 recruiting class

Roster

Schedule and results
The 2018 Big Ten tournament was held at Madison Square Garden in New York City. Due to the Big East's use of that venue for their conference tournament, the Big Ten tournament took place one week earlier than usual, ending the week before Selection Sunday. This resulted in teams having nearly two weeks off before the NCAA tournament.  

|-
!colspan=9 style=| Exhibition

|-
!colspan=9 style=| Regular season

|-
!colspan=9 style=|Big Ten tournament

|-
!colspan=9 style=|NCAA tournament

Rankings

^Coaches Poll did not release a Week 2 poll at the same time AP did.
*AP does not release post-NCAA tournament rankings.

See also
2017–18 Ohio State Buckeyes women's basketball team

References

Ohio State Buckeyes men's basketball seasons
Ohio State
Ohio State
Ohio State Buckeyes
Ohio State Buckeyes